Aubrey Meyer (born 1947) is an author, violinist, composer and climate campaigner.

A former member of the UK Green Party, he co-founded the Global Commons Institute in 1990.

Life
Aubrey Meyer was born in Yorkshire in 1947. He was raised in Cape Town, South Africa from 1952. In 1968 he gained a Bachelor of Music from the Music College, Cape Town University.

He won Southern African Music Rights Organisation (SAMRO) scholarship for two years study abroad. From 1969 to 1971 he studied at the Royal College of Music in London. There he studied composition with Phillip Cannon and viola with the late Cecil Aronowitz. He won the International Music Company Prize and the Stanton Jeffries Music Prize.

After the Royal College, he earned his living playing viola in orchestras: - principal viola in Scottish Theatre Ballet (1971), Ulster (1972), Gulbenkian Orchestra, CAPAB Orchestra and as a rank-and-file player in the Sadler's Wells Royal Ballet and finally in the London Philharmonic Orchestra.

He has lived in London since 1980.

During this period he continued composing.  His one-act ballet 'Exequy' led to the award of a Master of Music degree in composition from the University of Cape Town. In 1980, Meyer returned to London, combining composition with playing and his ballet score Choros for the Sadlers Wells Royal Ballet for the ballet by David Bintley, won an Evening Standard Award (1984); reviews for Exequy & Choros.

In 1988, while looking for a theme for a new composition, he heard about the environmentalist Chico Mendez who had been assassinated for his work in trying to prevent the destruction of the Brazilian rainforest, and he abandoned music for the UK Green Party of England and Wales. He co-founded the Global Commons Institute (GCI) in 1990 to start a programme to counter the threat of climate change based on the founding premise of 'Equity and Survival'.

At the request of the Intergovernmental Panel on Climate Change (IPCC) in 1992, Meyer conceived and presented his analysis of 'The Unequal Use of the Global Commons' to Working Group Three of the IPCC Second Assessment Report. This was dubbed 'Expansion and Divergence' and, led to an international rejection, at the UN climate negotiations in 1995, of the global cost benefit analysis of climate change by some economists from the US and UK.

Contraction and Convergence
This led to the development of GCI's framework of Contraction & Convergence (C&C). Introduced at the UNFCCC in 1996, C&C's approach to stabilizing greenhouse gases in the atmosphere at 'safe' level (by shrinking and sharing the limited and finite weight of such gases that future human activity can release into the atmosphere on an equal per capita basis) raises a key issue in the climate change debate.

As a musician and string player, Meyer says the world must collaborate with musical discipline to avert runaway climate change: i.e. play C&C's 'carbon reduction score' in time, in tune and together.

C&C was introduced to the UNFCCC at COP-2 Geneva:

C&C became this iconic image in the months that followed.

C&C was on the agenda at COP-3 Kyoto.

C&C was on the agenda at COP-4 Buenos Aires when host Government published this in their conference newspaper.

C&C was on the Agenda at COP-6 The Hague with Chairman Jan Pronk advocating it.

C&C was on the agenda for COP-15 at Copenhagen, but was not agreed.

C&C now considered by some as "the most preferable equity framework".

C&C considered by others as "the best possible solution to the twin problems of climate change and inequity".

Meyer has now enclosed C&C in the 'Carbon Budget Accounting Tool'
(CBAT online) 
(CBAT notes)
(CBAT appreciation)

Comments by third parties
"Some proposals compensate the potential burden on developing nations with generous emissions allocation, whether as a simple strategy to obtain developing countries support for the regime or in a realisation of the global equity principle borrowed from social justice. A famous such proposal is 'Contraction and Convergence' developed by Aubrey Meyer."
Act Locally Trade Globally; Emissions Trading for Climate Policy Organisation for Economic Cooperation and Development IEA

"I think Aubrey is a good gentleman. He has really been on this issue for years, for donkey’s years and he’s not giving up and he has the stamina. I think if we were all of us like Aubrey we would have achieved very high levels. Unfortunately not many of us have been that strong".
Joshua Wairoto, Deputy Director Kenya Met Office speaking at the UN Climate Negotiations in 2007.

"I think that Aubrey Meyer has done an amazing job and has shown extraordinary persistence and ingenuity in working out a scheme of this kind and I very much admire him for it. Above all he has laid out a kind of intellectual and legal framework which is what we need if we are going to set global arrangements in place and these global arrangements should I believe be fully reflected in the Bill that is now before the UK Parliament to regulate climate change. This is not the time for half-measures or quarter measures or fiddling with the problem. It is important to lay out the principles and then see how they should best be interpreted to give effect to a common human problem".
Sir Crispin Tickell, former British Ambassador, Director of the Policy Foresight Programme James Martin 21st Century School Oxford University.

"It seems to me that Contraction and Convergence is the basic principle that should guide climate policy, and that this policy is really unchallenged in principle by any of the climate models under discussion. Granted that it is good to have accurate models of how the world works, and to work out the numerical balances of C&C. Nevertheless, I wonder at what point complex and uncertain empirical models become a distraction from simple first principles? C&C is a necessary condition for a just and sustainable world. With best wishes & admiration for your important work on C&C."
Herman Daly, Emeritus Professor, University of Maryland

On 4 February 2009, Lord Adair Turner (chair, UK Climate Change Committee) confirmed to the House of Commons Environmental Audit Committee that, "it’s very difficult to imagine a long-term path for the world that is not somewhat related to a contract and converge type approach....we have made a very clear statement that we cannot imagine a global deal that is both do-able and fair, which doesn’t end up by mid century with roughly equal rights per capita to emit, and that is clearly said in the report".

On 24 June 2009, Rajendra Pachauri, (Chairman of the IPCC) said the following “ When one looks at the kinds of reductions that would be required globally, the only means for doing so is to ensure that there’s contraction and convergence, and I think there’s growing acceptance of this reality. I don’t see how else we might be able to fit within the overall budget for emissions for the world as a whole by 2050.  We need to start putting this principle into practice as early as possible, so that by the time we reach 2050, we’re not caught by surprise, we’re well on a track for every country in the world that would get us there...  On the matter of 'historic responsibility', there is no doubt that accelerating the rate of convergence relative to the rate of contraction is a way of answering that we really need to get agreement from Developed and Developing Countries to subscribe to this principle".

C&C is the most widely cited and arguably the most widely supported proposal for UNFCCC-compliance in play and many people believe C&C will yet prove to be the overarching principle that is adopted and that allows all nations to find common ground on how to achieve 'climate truth and reconciliation' and avert climate chaos.

Awards
Meyer's environmental efforts have led to many awards. He is the recipient of the Andrew Lees Memorial Prize, 1998; Schumacher Award, 2000; Findhorn Fellowship, 2004; Eurosolar Award 2006; City of London, Life-time's Achievement Award, 2005; Honorary Fellow of Royal Institute of British Architects, 2007; UNEP FI Global Roundtable Financial Leadership Award, 2007. and in 2008 a cross party group of British MPs nominated Meyer for the 2008 Nobel Peace Prize. He was nominated with wide support, for the Zayed Prize in 2010. He was nominated for the Blue Planet Prize, again with wide support, in 2014.

See also
Global Commons Institute
Contraction and Convergence

Bibliography
 GLOBE briefing on Contraction and Convergence
 Contraction & Convergence: The Global Solution to Climate Change'
 The Kyoto Protocol & the emergence of C&C as a framework for an international political solution to GHG emissions abatement.
 Reinforcing Asia-Europe Co-operation on Climate Change
 The GCI Archive 1989-2004
 Towards a Sustainable EU Policy on Climate Change - GCI Evidence to the House of Lords 
 Surviving Climate Change - The Case for Contraction and Convergence.
 The Economics of Climate Change Chevening Fellows Programme Cambridge
 Contraction and Convergence and International Conceptual Framework for Preventing Dangerous Climate Change
 Carbon Countdown - the Campaign for Contraction and Convergence.

References

External links
Global Commons Institute
 

1947 births
Living people
British emigrants to South Africa
South African writers